= Hargobindgarh =

Sri Hargobindgarh
- Village
- Country: India
- State: Punjab
- District: Kapurthala
- Tehsil: Phagwara

Government
  - Type: Panchayat raj
  - Body: Gram panchayat

Area
  - Total: 259 ha (640 acres)

Population (2011)
  - Total: 23; 12/11 ♂/♀
  - Scheduled Castes: 4; 2/2 ♂/♀
  - Total Households: 5

Languages
  - Official: Punjabi
- Time zone: UTC+5:30 (IST)
- ISO 3166 code: IN-PB
- Website: kapurthala.gov.in

Sri Hargobindgarh is a village in Phagwara in Kapurthala district of Punjab State, India. It is located 9 kilometres (5.6 mi) from sub district headquarter and 43 kilometres (27 mi) from district headquarter. The village is administrated by Sarpanch an elected representative of the village.

== Demography ==
As of 2011, The village has a total number of 5 houses and the population of 23 of which 12 are males while 11 are females. According to the report published by Census India in 2011, out of the total population of the village 4 people are from Schedule Caste and the village does not have any Schedule Tribe population so far.

== See also ==
- List of villages in India
